André Schadt is a retired German swimmer who won a silver medal in the  medley relay at the 1986 World Aquatics Championships. He also won two gold medals in freestyle relays at the European Championships in 1985 and 1989. In 1986 and 1989 he won the national championships in the 100 m freestyle event.

He retired from swimming in 1991.

References

Living people
German male swimmers
German male freestyle swimmers
World Aquatics Championships medalists in swimming
European Aquatics Championships medalists in swimming
Year of birth missing (living people)